Catherine D. Wolfram is an American micro-economist, academic and researcher. 
Catherine Wolfram was named in March 2021 as the United States Department of the Treasury Deputy Assistant Secretary for Climate and Energy Economics  She is the Cora Jane Flood Professor of Business Administration and Associate Dean for Academic Affairs at the Haas School of Business at University of California, Berkeley where she also serves as a Faculty Director of The E2e Project and as Scientific Director for Energy and the Environment at Center for Effective Global Action. She also directs the National Bureau of Economic Research's Environment and Energy Economics Program.

Wolfram specializes in the economics of energy industries in the U.S. and other countries. She has worked on analyzing rural electrification programs in the developing world, the effects of environmental regulation on energy markets, and on developing statistical measures for improving business and policy decisions.

Wolfram is a Faculty Affiliate at J-PAL, and a Senior Policy Scholar for Georgetown Center for Business and Public Policy.

Education
Wolfram studied economics and received her bachelor's degree from Harvard University in 1989 and her Doctoral degree from MIT in 1996.

Career
Wolfram became an Assistant Professor of Economics at Harvard University in 1996. In 2000, she left Harvard University and joined UC Berkeley's Haas School of Business as an Assistant Professor and was later promoted to Associate Professor in 2005. Wolfram was appointed as a Cora Jane Flood Professor of Business Administration at Haas School of Business in 2013.

At UC Berkeley, Wolfram was appointed as Faculty Director of the Energy Institute at Haas in 2009, and as a Faculty Director of E2e Project in 2013. She also served as a Scientific Director for Energy and the Environment at Berkeley's Center for Effective Global Action, and as Associate Dean for Academic Affairs at Haas School of Business.

In 2016, Wolfram was appointed as a Program Director of Environmental and Energy Economics Program at the National Bureau of Economic Research.

Research
Wolfram's work is focused on economics of energy industries. She has conducted numerous research projects focusing on energy and environmental economics. She has worked on analyzing rural electrification programs in the developing world, energy efficiency programs in the US, the effects of environmental regulation on energy markets, and on developing statistical measures for improving business and policy decisions. Wolfram's later work focuses on randomized controlled trials regarding the energy policy in both developed and developing countries.

Economics of energy industry
Wolfram studied the bidding behavior regarding the daily electricity auction in U.K., and found that bidding applies to all infra-marginal units if set at a high equilibrium price. She published a paper in the late 1990s on an empirical study on Britain's electricity industry, and derived price-cost markup estimates via approaches not relying on cost data. Her study indicated that prices were lower than the range predicted by the theoretical models, and highlighted various factors for the price levels.

Wolfram studied the work of Fred Kahn and discussed the technological advancements in the energy industry along with the constraints regarding proliferation of time-varying electricity pricing. In late 2010s, she published an article about the Weatherization Assistance Program and found the upfront investment costs to be twice the actual value of the energy savings.

Rural electrification in developing countries
Wolfram has conducted a number of studies regarding energy demand in the developing world. She argued that the forecasts for energy demand in the emerging economies of the world are understated and that these countries will play a major role in driving medium-run growth in energy consumption.

Wolfram conducted a study on electrification for under grid households in rural Kenya. She provided evidence for low electrification rates despite the investments in grid infrastructure.

Privatization and restructuring in the US and UK
Wolfram published a paper in 1999 regarding the duopoly power in the British electricity spot market and presented the results of an empirical study that indicated the prices to be higher than the marginal costs but still lower than the range predicted by most theoretical models. She also provided possible explanations for the observed price levels.

In mid 2000s, Wolfram authored a paper assessing the impact of electricity industry restructuring on generating plant operating efficiency using the plant-level data. Her study indicated that the largest reductions in nonfuel operating expenses and employment were experienced by the investor-owned utility plants in restructured environments. Wolfram's study on cost minimization in regulated environments indicated modest medium-term efficiency benefits from replacing regulated monopoly with a market-based industry structure.

Awards and honors
1996 – Review of Economic Studies Tour
1998-1999 - National Science Foundation Award for Beginning Academics (Grant No. SBR9810402)
2006, 2008 - Recipient, Cheit Award for Best Teacher in Haas Evening MBA Program
Barbara and Gerson Bakar Faculty Fellow

Bibliography

Books
The Design and Implementation of US Climate Policy (2012) 
Environmental and Energy Policy and the Economy: Volume 1 (2020)

Selected articles
Wolfram, C. D. (1999). Measuring duopoly power in the British electricity spot market. American Economic Review, 89(4), 805–826.
Fabrizio, K. R., Rose, N. L., & Wolfram, C. D. (2007). Do markets reduce costs? Assessing the impact of regulatory restructuring on US electric generation efficiency. American Economic Review, 97(4), 1250–1277.
Wolfram, C., Shelef, O., & Gertler, P. (2012). How will energy demand develop in the developing world?. Journal of Economic Perspectives, 26(1), 119–38.
Fowlie, M., Greenstone, M., & Wolfram, C. (2018). Do Energy Efficiency Investments Deliver? Evidence From The Weatherization Assistance Program. Quarterly Journal of Economics, 133(3), 1597–1644.
Lee, K., Miguel, E., & Wolfram, C. (2020). Experimental evidence on the economics of rural electrification. Journal of Political Economy, 128(4), 1523–1565.

References 

Living people
Harvard College alumni
MIT School of Humanities, Arts, and Social Sciences alumni
American women economists
University of California, Berkeley faculty
American women academics
American academic administrators
Year of birth missing (living people)
United States Department of the Treasury officials
21st-century American women